"Let's Get Blown" is a song by American rapper Snoop Dogg featuring musician Pharrell Williams. It was released on December 13, 2004, as the second single released from the former's seventh studio album R&G (Rhythm & Gangsta): The Masterpiece (2004). It was produced by The Neptunes (Williams and Chad Hugo) and features additional vocals from American singer Keyshia Cole.

Composition and recording
"Let's Get Blown" is a hip hop, mid-tempo that features beats and influences of funk and G-funk music. The song samples and contains interpolations from Slave's "Watching You", which was also interpolated in "Gin and Juice". It was recorded by Andrew Coleman and Phil Tan at Record Plant Studios, Los Angeles.

Music video
The video was first aired in the week of February 21, 2005. It was 27th on LAUNCH Music Videos Top 100 in January 2005 and 59th on MTV's Top 100 of 2005 video list in December. The music video was directed by Paul Hunter.

Awards
In 2005, the Neptunes were nominated for Grammy Award for Producer of the Year, Non-Classical in the Rap category for composing this song.

Commercial performance
"Let's Get Blown" is one of Snoop Dogg's biggest hits in the United Kingdom, peaking at number 13.

Live performance
The song was performed live at The Tonight Show with Jay Leno on January 20, 2005.

Track listings

Charts

Weekly charts

Year-end charts

Release history

References

External links
 MusicMatch
 MVPA PDF

2004 singles
Music videos directed by Paul Hunter (director)
Pharrell Williams songs
Snoop Dogg songs
Song recordings produced by the Neptunes
Songs written by Pharrell Williams
Songs written by Chad Hugo
Songs written by Snoop Dogg
2004 songs
Geffen Records singles